Sternenberg is a former municipality in the district of Pfäffikon in the canton of Zürich in Switzerland. Bauma and Sternenberg merged to Bauma on 1 January 2015.

Geography

Of this area, 37.9% is used for agricultural purposes, while 58% is forested. Of the rest of the land, 3.8% is settled (buildings or roads) and the remainder (0.2%) is non-productive (rivers, glaciers or mountains).   housing and buildings made up 2.3% of the total area, while transportation infrastructure made up the rest (1.5%). Of the total unproductive area, water (streams and lakes) made up 0% of the area.   0.9% of the total municipal area was undergoing some type of construction.

Demographics
Sternenberg had a population (as of 2013) of 351.  , 4.0% of the population was made up of foreign nationals.   the gender distribution of the population was 51.3% male and 48.7% female.  Over the last 10 years the population has decreased at a rate of -1.4%.  Most of the population speaks German  (98.0%), with French being second most common ( 0.3%) and English being third ( 0.3%).

In the 2007 election the most popular party was the SVP which received 43.4% of the vote.  The next three most popular parties were the SPS (22.5%), the CSP (15.7%) and the Green Party (10.2%).

The age distribution of the population is children and teenagers (0–19 years old) make up 24.6% of the population, while adults (20–64 years old) make up 58.2% and seniors (over 64 years old) make up 17.2%.  In Sternenberg about 76.5% of the population (between age 25-64) have completed either non-mandatory upper secondary education or additional higher education (either university or a Fachhochschule).  There are 140 households in Sternenberg.

Sternenberg has an unemployment rate of 1.8%.  , there were 48 people employed in the primary economic sector and about 22 businesses involved in this sector.  33 people are employed in the secondary sector and there are 9 businesses in this sector.  46 people are employed in the tertiary sector, with 11 businesses in this sector.   41% of the working population were employed full-time, and 59% were employed part-time.

 there were 59 Catholics and 206 Protestants in Sternenberg. In the 2000 census, religion was broken down into several smaller categories. Of the rest of the population, 0% were Muslim, 2% belonged to another religion (not listed), 2.6% did not give a religion, and 16% were atheist or agnostic.

References

External links 

  

Former municipalities of the canton of Zürich